William H. Turner (1861–1942) was an Irish stage and film actor who appeared in a number American films during the silent era as a character actor. Born in Cork he was educated at a seminary in Liverpool.

Partial filmography

 Traffic in Souls (1913)
 The Daughters of Men (1914)
 The Great Ruby (1915)
 The Nation's Peril (1915)
 A Man's Making (1915)
 The Gamblers (1915)
 The City of Failing Light (1916)
 The Evangelist (1916)
 The Gods of Fate (1916)
 Her Bleeding Heart (1916)
 Love's Toll (1916)
 Her Good Name (1917)
 The Sporting Duchess (1920)
 The Prey (1920)
 Blow Your Own Horn (1923)
 The Darling of New York (1923)
 The Satin Girl (1923)
 Other Men's Daughters (1923)
 The Measure of a Man (1924)
 Why Get Married? (1924)
 American Manners (1924)
 Fast and Fearless (1924)
 The Garden of Weeds (1924)
 The Gaiety Girl (1924)
 The Enemy Sex (1924)
 Heir-Loons (1925)
 A Woman's Faith (1925)
 Where Was I? (1925)
The Monster (1925)
 Gold and Grit (1925)
 The Pony Express (1925)
 White Thunder (1925)
 The Warning Signal (1926)
 Red Hot Leather (1926)
 The Texas Streak (1926)
 Her Big Adventure (1926)
 Three Pals (1926)
 The Phantom Bullet (1926)
 Broadway After Midnight (1927)
 Driftin' Sands (1928)
 The Last Performance (1929)
 Love Me Tonight (1932)
 Laughter in Hell (1933)
 Advice to the Forlorn (1933)
 Black Fury (1935)
 Dimples (1936)

References

Bibliography
 Katchmer, George A. A Biographical Dictionary of Silent Film Western Actors and Actresses. McFarland, 2015.

External links

1861 births
1942 deaths
Irish male film actors
Irish male stage actors
Male actors from Cork (city)
Irish emigrants to the United States (before 1923)
20th-century Irish male actors